Rendez-Vous is a concept album by the French-born Greek presenter, author and singer-songwriter Nikos Aliagas, released on 17 October 2007 in Greece, Cyprus, France and Turkey. The album achieved considerable success and it was certificated gold in Greece.

Album information

Participants
Many international stars and friends of Nikos participated in the album. Some of them are Paul Anka, Antonis Remos, Elena Paparizou, Christos Dantis, Gorgia, Murray Head, NiVo, Adam Cohen, Souad Massi, Demi Evans, Liane Foly, Nolwenn Leroy and Irini Kiriakidou.

Style and lyrical content
The album contains many different styles of songs from jazz to rock and rap. There are 13 duets which are covers from very popular songs.

Track listing

 "Hara Mou" (Nikos Aliagas)
 "Mack the Knife" (duet with Paul Anka)
 "You Do Something to Me" (duet with Murray Head)
 "Mine Ki Allo (Ain't No Sunshine)" (duet with Antonis Remos and NiVo)
 "Mi Mou Milas (Rendez-Vous)" (duet with Gorgia)
 "Zileia Monaksia (L' Envie D' Aimer)" (duet with Helena Paparizou)
 "Horepse Me San Paidi (Dance Me to the End of Love)" (duet with Adam Cohen)
 "Trifera" (Ghir Enta)  (duet with Souad Massi) 
 "Blues for Mama" (duet with Demi Evans)
 "Ena Palio Tragoudi Blues (Toute La Musique Que J' Aime)" (duet with Christos Dantis)
 "Ils S'Aiment" (duet with Liane Foly)
 "Opos Sinithos" (May Way ad.of Comme D' Habitude) (duet with Antonis Remos)
 "Una Notte a Napoli" (duet with Irini Kiriakidou)
 "I Proteleftaia Goulia" (Slamos) (Nikos Aliagas)
 "La Nuit Je Mens" (duet with Nolwenn Leroy)

DVD features
Recording sessions of the album in France, Los Angeles and Greece. 
Interviews from the participants and backstage scenes from the concert.

Release history

Charts

References

2007 albums
Concept albums
Covers albums
Greek-language albums
Nikos Aliagas albums
Sony Music Greece albums